Bernhard Unger (born 23 April 1999) is an Austrian professional footballer who plays as a defender for Austrian Bundesliga club Rapid Wien.

Club career
Unger made his professional debut with Mattersburg in a 1-0 Austrian Bundesliga loss to Rapid Wien on 4 July 2020. On 19 August 2019, Unger signed a contract with Rapid Wien.

References

External links
 
 OEFB Profile
 OEFB NT Profile

1999 births
Living people
Austrian footballers
SK Rapid Wien players
SV Mattersburg players
Austrian Regionalliga players
Austrian Football Bundesliga players
Association football defenders